Michael Hepburn (born 17 August 1991) is an Australian track and road cyclist, who currently rides for UCI WorldTeam .  He is a two-time Olympics silver medalist.

From Brisbane, Hepburn started competitively cycling at 14 years of age after making the change from triathlons.

Sporting achievements
Some of Hepburn's notable achievements include winning the Under 23 road race in the Australian Open Road Championships when he was just 18, and winning the teams pursuit in the 2010 UCI Track Cycling World Championships in Denmark.  In 2009 he broke the world record in the U19 3000m Individual Pursuit at the 2009 Australian Track Championships before going on to break the same world record two more times to win at the 2009 Junior World Championships in Russia. He competed at the 2010 Delhi Commonwealth Games where he won a bronze medal in the Individual pursuit and a gold in the Team pursuit.

It was announced on 8 November 2011 that Hepburn would join the  team for their inaugural season in 2012.  In 2012, he won the silver medal in the men's team pursuit at the 2012 Olympics.  He competed in the men's road race and the men's time trial at the 2014 Commonwealth Games, finishing in 6th in the time trial.

He won silver in the same event at the 2016 Olympics.

In July 2018, he was named in the start list for the 2018 Tour de France.

Major results

Track

2009
 UCI Junior Track Cycling World Championships
1st  Individual pursuit
2nd  Team pursuit
 National Junior Track Championships
1st  Individual pursuit
1st  Team pursuit
1st  Omnium
 2009–10 UCI Track Cycling World Cup Classics
1st  Team pursuit, Beijing
1st  Team pursuit, Melbourne
2010
 Commonwealth Games
1st  Team pursuit
3rd  Individual pursuit
 1st  Team pursuit, UCI Track World Championships
 1st  Omnium, National Track Championships
 1st  Team pursuit, 2010–11 UCI Track Cycling World Cup Classics, Melbourne
2011
 UCI Track World Championships
1st  Team pursuit
3rd  Individual pursuit
 Oceania Track Championships
1st  Individual pursuit
1st  Team pursuit
 National Track Championships
2nd  Team pursuit
3rd  Individual pursuit
3rd  Points race
2012
 2nd  Team pursuit, Olympic Games
2013
 UCI Track World Championships
1st  Team pursuit
1st  Individual pursuit
2016
 1st  Team pursuit, UCI Track World Championships
 2nd  Team pursuit, Olympic Games

Road

2009
 Tour of the Murray River
1st Stages 11 & 12
2010
 1st  Road race, National Under-23 Road Championships
 1st Stage 1 (TTT) Thüringen Rundfahrt der U23
 3rd Rogaland GP
 9th Memorial Davide Fardelli
2011
 1st Stage 2 Tour of Norway
 Tour de l'Avenir
1st Prologue & Stage 4
 1st Stage 2 (TTT) Thüringen Rundfahrt der U23
 2nd Time trial, National Under-23 Road Championships
 2nd Gran Premio della Liberazione
 3rd  Time trial, UCI Under-23 Road World Championships
 6th Overall Olympia's Tour
2012
 4th Time trial, National Road Championships
2013
 2nd  Team time trial, UCI Road World Championships
 2nd Duo Normand (with Jens Mouris)
2014
 1st  Time trial, National Road Championships
 1st Stage 3 (ITT) Tour of Qatar
 1st Stage 1 (TTT) Giro d'Italia
 2nd  Team time trial, UCI Road World Championships
 6th Time trial, Commonwealth Games
2015
 1st  Time trial, Oceania Road Championships
 1st Stage 1 (TTT) Giro d'Italia
 3rd Overall Bay Classic Series
2016
 3rd  Team time trial, UCI Road World Championships
2017
 1st Stage 2 Bay Classic Series
 4th Time trial, National Road Championships
 7th Hong Kong Challenge
2019
 1st Stage 1 (TTT) Tirreno–Adriatico
 1st Stage 1 (TTT) Czech Cycling Tour
 5th Antwerp Port Epic
2020
 1st Stage 1 (TTT) Czech Cycling Tour
 National Road Championships
4th Time trial
8th Road race

Grand Tour general classification results timeline

References

External links

1991 births
Australian track cyclists
Sportsmen from Queensland
Cyclists from Brisbane
Australian male cyclists
UCI Track Cycling World Champions (men)
Commonwealth Games bronze medallists for Australia
Cyclists at the 2010 Commonwealth Games
Commonwealth Games gold medallists for Australia
Australian Institute of Sport cyclists
Cyclists at the 2012 Summer Olympics
Cyclists at the 2016 Summer Olympics
Olympic cyclists of Australia
Living people
Olympic silver medalists for Australia
Olympic medalists in cycling
Medalists at the 2012 Summer Olympics
Medalists at the 2016 Summer Olympics
Cyclists at the 2014 Commonwealth Games
Commonwealth Games medallists in cycling
Medallists at the 2010 Commonwealth Games